A Short Hike is an adventure video game by Canadian indie game designer Adam Robinson-Yu (also known as adamgryu). It is an open world exploration game in which the player is tasked with reaching the summit of a mountain to get cellphone reception. The game was released for Microsoft Windows, macOS, and Linux in July 2019, for Nintendo Switch in August 2020, and for PlayStation 4 and Xbox One in November 2021.

A Short Hike received positive reviews from critics, who widely praised its relaxing gameplay, freedom of exploration, and flying mechanics, while some criticized the short length and the handling of some story elements. It won the Seumas McNally Grand Prize at the 2020 Independent Games Festival.

Gameplay 

The player has the ability to jog, climb, swim, and glide through an open-world park while controlling Claire, an anthropomorphic bird. To reach the peak, the player must find or purchase golden feathers that afford extra jumps and the ability to climb rock faces. According to a sign on Hawk Peak Trail, the peak can be reached with as few as seven golden feathers. Once the player reaches the peak, they are free to explore the park and complete side activities as they please.

In addition to the main goal, the island is populated with other animals, who offer side-quests and activities including fishing, finding lost items, and playing a volleyball-like mini-game called "beachstickball". Rewards for these activities include items which improve the player's ability to explore the park, such as running shoes or a compass. The player can also collect shells, sticks, coins, and other items to help complete these side-quests.

The game has an adaptive soundtrack that changes based on world events such as the weather, or player actions such as flying. It also features a dynamic camera created with the Unity tool, Cinemachine.

Plot 

The protagonist and player character is Claire, a young bird who spends her days off by traveling to Hawk Peak Provincial Park, where her Aunt May works as a ranger.

In an opening cutscene, Claire's mother drives her to a ferry that will take her to the park for the summer. When Claire arrives, her Aunt informs her that there's no cellphone reception in the park except for at Hawk Peak. Claire has never hiked the Hawk Peak Trail before, but is expecting an important call, so she decides to go to the summit. It is then up to the player whether Claire helps the other animals on the island or heads straight for Hawk Peak. A sign at the mountain's base warns it is a strenuous hike, and other characters will remark that the trail is too difficult for them.

When Claire reaches the peak, she congratulates herself for making it and sits in view of an aurora. Soon her cell phone rings, revealing the caller is her mother. She acknowledges that she had a surgery after sending Claire away. Claire is upset she wasn't there for her, but Claire's mother says she is proud of Claire for climbing Hawk Peak. The call is interrupted when an updraft emerges from the mountain. It makes Claire nervous, but her mother urges her to ride it before it disappears. Claire rides the updraft, soaring over the park.

Claire can then return to her Aunt, whereupon she explains to her all of the side activities she did on her hike.

Development 
In December 2018, Robinson-Yu took a break from developing his Untitled Paper RPG and started work on A Short Hike. Playing the games The Haunted Island, a Frog Detective Game and Minit convinced him that short games can be successful, too. He later shared a prototype of A Short Hike on Twitter. Rendering the game's world using "big crunchy pixels" and simple models allowed Robinson-Yu to expand the scope of the game in spite of his limited art skills. The color palette for the game is sampled directly from photos of the Canadian Shield in autumn.

Composer Mark Sparling created an adaptive soundtrack system that combines layers of melodies and ambient music depending on where the player is and how they are traversing the terrain. Sparling cited as influences the Studio Ghibli composer, Joe Hisaishi; the soundtracks for Animal Crossing: New Leaf and Firewatch; the Sufjan Stevens folk album, Carrie & Lowell; and the Steve Reich minimalist album, Music for 18 Musicians.

After receiving funding via the Humble Original program, Robinson-Yu committed to releasing the game in three months. He tracked his progress using a simplified version of the scrum framework, and used existing Unity tools such as InControl and Cinemachine, as well as assets from previous projects. He also prioritized adding content over fixing small bugs.

Release 
The game was first released for subscribers of the Humble Monthly program on April 5, 2019, and later as a standalone game for Microsoft Windows, macOS, and Linux on July 30, 2019. A version for Nintendo Switch was released on August 18, 2020. Versions for PlayStation 4 and Xbox One were released on November 16, 2021. On 19 August 2022, the game was announced to be getting a limited physical release and collector's edition for Nintendo Switch via Super Rare Games to be released on 25 August 2022.

Reception 

A Short Hike received "generally favorable reviews" according to the review aggregator website Metacritic, receiving aggregate scores of 82/100 for the PC version, 88/100 for the Switch version, and 83/100 for the PlayStation 4 version. Reviewers praised the peacefulness and replay value of the setting, as well as the open-ended gameplay, with several critics comparing the game's open world to The Legend of Zelda: Breath of the Wild.

Reviewing the game for Nintendo Life, Stuart Gipp awarded A Short Hike a 10/10, calling it "a truly complete game" and "a milestone in indie games" for its freedom of gameplay and what he felt was "a fat-free experience". Cathlyn Vania of Adventure Gamers rated the game 4.5/5 stars, calling it a "relaxing adventure filled with not only humor but the tenderness of personal connections". Matthew Reynolds of Eurogamer named A Short Hike one of his Games of the Year, stating that the density of the island resulted in "an adventure far richer than games many times  its length". Khee Hoon Chan of GameSpot similarly praised the game for its controls, free-roaming gameplay, and overall "comforting, even pastoral allure", awarding it a 9/10.

Kevin Mersereau of Destructoid was slightly more mixed, but overall positive, rating the game a 7.5/10. He called it a "palate-cleanser" that is "relaxed" and "unique", albeit "far from perfect", praising the game's flying mechanics, but criticizing its short length and "anvil-dropped" plot elements. GameCentral review similarly critiqued the game's length and the reveal of who Claire's phone call is from, but awarded the game an 8/10, calling it "utterly charming and perfectly paced". Washington Post critic, Christopher Byrd, described the game as "built to foster a spirit of comfort rather than risk", criticizing the easiness of player tasks while still recommending the game as "an achievement".

Awards

References

External links 

Official website of Adam Robinson-Yu

2019 video games
Indie video games
Adventure games
Independent Games Festival winners
Linux games
MacOS games
Nintendo Switch games
Open-world video games
PlayStation 4 games
Seumas McNally Grand Prize winners
Single-player video games
Video games about birds
Video games developed in Canada
Video games set in Canada
Video games featuring female protagonists
Video games set in forests
Video games set on fictional islands
Video games with cel-shaded animation
Windows games
Xbox One games